Slaveykov may refer to:

Petko Slaveykov (1827-1895), Bulgarian poet and publicist
Pencho Slaveykov (1866-1912), Bulgarian poet, son of Petko
Slaveykov Peak, mountain on Smith Island (South Shetland Islands)
Slaveykov Square, square in Sofia
Petko Slaveykov (village), village in Gabrovo Province

Bulgarian-language surnames